Samuel Marshall may refer to:

 S.L.A. Marshall (1900–1977), American military historian
 Sam Marshall, fictional character in the Australian TV drama series Home and Away
 Samuel Marshall (1803–1879), founder Marshall & Sons music retailer of Adelaide, South Australia
 Samuel Marshall (Canadian politician) (1757–1813), merchant, shipbuilder and political figure in Nova Scotia
 Samuel R. Marshall, insurance lobbyist in Pennsylvania
 Samuel S. Marshall (1821–1890), American politician, U.S. Representative from Illinois
 Samuel Taylor Marshall (1812–1895), co-founder of the Beta Theta Pi fraternity